La falena (The Moth-Woman) is a leggenda or opera in three acts by composer Antonio Smareglia with an Italian libretto by . The opera premiered at the Teatro Rossini in Venice on 6 September 1897.

Musical analysis
La falena is a through composed opera containing an all-pervasive symphonic movement which is only broken in between acts. The music for the extended Act 2 duet between the virtuous king and the evil protagonist is particularly thrilling. The two men move as hallucinatory figures as the music rages with nightmarish obsessive urges that heighten the opera's drama.

Roles

References

Operas
1897 operas
Operas by Antonio Smareglia
Italian-language operas